Ceradenia jungermannioides, the mossy finger fern, is a species of fern in the family Polypodiaceae indigenous to the Neotropical realm (in the Caribbean and the Amazon rainforest) and the Azores.

References

Polypodiaceae
Ferns of the Americas
Flora of the Azores
Taxobox binomials not recognized by IUCN